There are several motor racing teams which have been called Autobarn Racing.
 Rod Nash Racing - Autobarn Racing identity from 2006 to 2007.
 HSV Dealer Team - Autobarn Racing identity from 2008.
 Walkinshaw Racing - Autobarn Racing identity from 2009.
 Triple Eight Race Engineering - Autobarn Lowndes Racing identity from 2018.

Australian auto racing teams
Supercars Championship teams